The 1983 Clásica de San Sebastián was the third edition of the Clásica de San Sebastián cycle race and was held on 17 August 1983. The race started and finished in San Sebastián. The race was won by Claude Criquielion.

General classification

References

Clásica de San Sebastián
San